Šerefudin's White Mosque is a mosque located in Visoko, Bosnia and Herzegovina. It is of great architectural importance to the city and area. The mosque's architect was Zlatko Ugljen, the craftsman was Ismet Imamović, while the contractor was Zvijezda from Visoko. Original mosque was built in 1477, but it was completely reconstructed and finished in 1980. It received its most notable award in 1983, when it received the Aga Khan Award for Architecture. The jury commended the mosque for its boldness, creativity and brilliance, as well as its originality and innovation. In 2007 it received another recognition, this time from Hungarian architects for being one of the three best designed places of worship in Europe.

Plan, structure and materials
The mosque comprises five functional areas:
Access space and first courtyard
Mosque proper
Annex building
Graveyard
Minarets

The central space of the mosque is designed both for praying and other religious activities such as lectures and discussions. The indoor area for praying is an annex building. The annex consists of a small auditorium and an office. Traditionally, in Bosnian mosques, graveyards act as a buffer between mosque and other buildings, but in this case, the graveyard is isolated. Architect Zlatko Ugljen used the traditional layout of Bosnian mosques which consist of a courtyard leading to a square praying area, over which rises a cupola. The difference is in an unusual arrangement of this concept, where large glass panels make this mosque more integrated with the rest of the building. Windows with five panels symbolizes Five Pillars of Islam, but also casts light in the interior. The southeast facade of the cupola is faced toward the Ka'ba. Fountains, pulpit and other decorative elements are simple, just like the calligraphy in the interior which is simple and readable. Both the interior and exterior of the mosque are painted white, while the beige color was used for the floor, and green for a few metallic elements, like frames and tubes. 

Building materials used were plastered concrete for walls and cupola, white mortar for the inner walls, a combination of pine wood and white mortar for surfaces of many interior elements, local travertine tiles for exterior paths and courtyard paving, and iron tubes for minarets, while the floors inside of the mosque are covered with green carpet.

Aga Khan Award for Architecture
The award that came from the Aga Khan Development Network listed this mosque as one of the most valuable modern mosques built in Bosnia and Herzegovina. The network stated that:

"The mosque serves as a religious and intellectual centre for its community. Its geometrically simple plan encloses a complex, slope-ceilinged, skylit volume, pure, abstract, sparsely ornamented and painted white. The archetypal Bosnian mosque has a simple square plan crowned by a cupola and entered by means of a small porch. The White Mosque's plan conforms to the archetype, but its roof is a freely deformed quarter of a cupola, pierced by five skylights, themselves composed of segments of quarter cupolas. The effect is one of confrontation between the elementary plan and the sophisticated hierarchy of roof cones. The principal symbolic elements, mihrab, minbar, minaret and fountains, have a fresh folk art character subtly enhanced by the avant-garde geometries of their setting."

Zlatko Ugljen has also been commended for "masterfully assimilating modern influences, especially Le Corbusier's Ronchamp Cathedral, and traditional Ottoman forms and elements".

See also
Bosnian architecture
Islamic architecture
Visoko

References

External links

48 images of mosque
Comprehensive description of mosque with photos
The Diversity of Mosque Architectures

Buildings and structures in Visoko
Mosques completed in 1980
Mosques in Bosnia and Herzegovina
Sunni mosques